Michelle Bartsch-Hackley (born February 12, 1990) is an American professional volleyball player for the United States women's national volleyball team. She played collegiate volleyball with the University of Illinois Fighting Illini from 2008 to 2011. She won gold with the national team at the 2020 Tokyo Summer Olympics.

Career
Michelle Bartsch's career began at Collinsville High School in Illinois, where she excelled at basketball, swimming and track and field. While playing for her high school, she joined the US youth selections, winning the gold medal at the US Under-18 Championship in 2006 and the North American Under-20 Championship in 2008. She was also awarded the title of Best Server in the competition.

From 2008 to 2011, she played for the University of Illinois, Urbana-Champaign, reaching the NCAA Division I National Championship in her senior year, losing to the University of California, Los Angeles; despite this defeat, she received several individual awards during the season.

She made her professional debut in 2012 with Llaneras de Toa Baja, in the Liga de Voleibol Superior Feminino in Puerto Rico.

She then played for Rote Raben Vilsbiburg from 2013 to 2014, winning the German Cup. She stayed in Germany the following season, but played for the Dresdner Sportclub 1898 club, who would go on to win the German Championship 2015 and again the German Championship plus the German Cup in 2016. In 2015 she made her debut in the US national team. In 2015, she won a gold medal at the Pan American Games. In 2017, she won a gold medal at the 2017 Women's Pan-American Volleyball Cup, and a bronze medal at the 2017 FIVB Volleyball Women's World Grand Champions Cup.

In 2016–17, she played for Neruda Volley di Bolzano in Serie A1. In 2017 she played in Futura Volley Busto Arsizio. In 2018 she was recruited by AGIL Volley. In 2019 she played for Beijing BAIC Motor China Volleyball League.

Bartsch-Hackley was named an alternate to the U.S. volleyball team at the 2016 Summer Olympics in Rio de Janeiro. She used this as motivation to earn a spot in the future Olympic Games, as she said in July 2021 “I think after being an alternate in 2016 I grew hungrier because I was so close at that time. The past few years I’ve tried to take every opportunity and use it to grow and improve.”

In 2020, she was inducted into the University of Illinois Athletics Hall of Fame.

In May 2021, she was named to the 18-player roster for the FIVB Volleyball Nations League tournament  played May 25-June 24 in Rimini, Italy. It was the only major international competition before the Tokyo Olympics in July. The U.S. team won gold and Bartsch-Hackley was named Best Outside Hitter and MVP.

On June 7, 2021, US National Team head coach Karch Kiraly announced she would be part of the 12-player Olympic roster for the 2020 Summer Olympics in Tokyo. On August 8, 2021, she won a gold medal as a member of the U.S. women's volleyball team that defeated Brazil 3–0 in the final match. She was named as co-"Best Outside Hitter" (along with teammate Jordan Larson) of the Olympics.

On April 12, 2022, Bartsch-Hackley announced that she will take a break after the 2022 club season concludes and will leave volleyball indefinitely through at least January 2023. During this period, she will not participate in any competitions or sign with new clubs.

Awards

Clubs
 2021–22 CEV Women's Champions League – Champion with Vakıfbank

Individual
 2018 Nations League "Best Outside Hitter"
 2018 Nations League "Most Valuable Player"
 2021 Nation's League "Best Outside Hitter"
 2021 Nations League "Most Valuable Player"2020 Summer Olympics - "Best Outside Hitter"''

Personal life 
Her husband is Corbin Hackley. Her husband travels with her when she plays and brings along their dog, Champion.

Her mother, Julie, played volleyball for the University of Kansas. Her father, Michael, played soccer at Blackburn College.

Her undergraduate degree from the University of Illinois in 2012 is in sports management.

Her brother, Andrew Bartsch, is married to Kelsey Card, who competed in the Tokyo Summer Olympics in the discus throw.

References

Living people
American women's volleyball players
1990 births
University of Illinois Urbana-Champaign alumni
American expatriate sportspeople in Italy
Outside hitters
Illinois Fighting Illini women's volleyball players
Volleyball players at the 2020 Summer Olympics
Olympic gold medalists for the United States in volleyball
Medalists at the 2020 Summer Olympics
Serie A1 (women's volleyball) players
American expatriate sportspeople in Turkey
VakıfBank S.K. volleyballers